MV Ulster Prince was a passenger ferry operated across the Irish Sea by P&O Ferries between 1967 and 1981. She was sold for further service in the Mediterranean and Far East and was scrapped in 2004.

History
Ulster Prince was the first of three new car ferries delivered to Coast Lines in 1966/67 to update the Irish Sea services of the Belfast Steamship Company. She was built by Harland and Wolff, launched in 1966 and with her sister,  took over the Liverpool - Belfast night service, replacing the pre-war motorships  and Ulster Prince (2). The third new ship,  was smaller and took over the Ardrossan - Belfast day service of Burns & Laird. In 1971, Coast Lines were taken over by P&O and the ferries took on the P&O Ferries colours, with pale blue funnels. The service closed in 1981 and Ulster  Prince was laid up in Ostend.

In 1982, Ulster Prince was sold to Panmar Ferries Services of Nicosia, Cyprus, and left for service in the Mediterranean. From 1983, she saw service in the Far East. In 1995, she was bought by Hellenic Mediterranean Lines and renamed Neptunia, but later the same year was in use as Panther for Hellenic Orient Lines between Bari and Çeşme. In 2000, she was named Vatan and then Manar, the latter for Al Thuraya Marine Service Company of Dubai between Port Rashid and Umm Qasr, Iraq.

Her end came in March 2004 when she was sold to Indian breakers. She arrived at Alang on 3 April 2004.

Service
1967-1981: Liverpool-Belfast
1983: Patras-Igoumenitsa-Ancona
1984: Hong Kong-China
1988: Macau-Taiwan
1995: Bari-Çeşme
1996: Patras-Igoumenitsa-Brindisi
2001-2004: Port Rashid-Umm Qasr, Iraq

References

Ferries of the United Kingdom
1966 ships
Ships of P&O Ferries
Ships built by Harland and Wolff